Homalernis is a genus of moths belonging to the subfamily Tortricinae of the family Tortricidae.

Species
Homalernis arystis Meyrick, 1918
Homalernis semaphora Meyrick, 1908

See also
List of Tortricidae genera

References

External links
tortricidae.com

Tortricidae genera